The sixth Women's World Chess Championship took place during the 7th Chess Olympiad, held in Stockholm, Sweden from 31 July to 14 August 1937. The final results were as follows:

{| class="wikitable"
! !!Player !! Points
|- style="background:#ccffcc;"
| style="background:gold;"| 1 ||  || 14  
|-
| style="background:silver;"| 2 ||  || 10  
|-
| style="background:#cc9966;" rowspan=2|3–4 ||  ||  9
|-
|  ||  9
|-
| 5 ||  ||  8½
|-
| rowspan=2|6–7 ||  ||  8
|-
|  ||  8
|-
| rowspan=2|8–9 ||  ||  7½
|-
|  ||  7½
|-
| rowspan=7|10–16 ||  ||  7
|-
|  || 7  
|-
|  || 7  
|-
|  ||  7
|-
|  ||  7
|-
|  ||  7
|-
|  ||  7
|-
| rowspan=4|17–20 ||  ||  6½
|-
|  ||  6½
|-
|  ||  6½
|-
|  ||  6½
|-
| rowspan=2|21–22 ||  || 6  
|-
|  || 6  
|-
| 23 ||  ||  5½
|-
| 24 ||  ||  5
|-
| 25 ||  ||  2
|-
| 26 ||  ||  1
|}

References 

Women's World Chess Championships
1937 in chess
Women in Stockholm